Rúnar Rúnarsson (born 20 January 1977 in Reykjavík) is an Icelandic screenwriter and director. Films for which he is credited as both writer and director include the feature film Volcano and the short films Anna, Two Birds, and The Last Farm (which was nominated for an Oscar). His second feature, Sparrows, is a coming-of-age story that was released in 2015. In 2019 his film Echo was released which comprises 56 vignettes to draw a portrait of modern-day Iceland at Christmas time.

References

External links
 

Icelandic film directors
Icelandic screenwriters
Living people
1977 births